Beef ball  is a commonly cooked food in Cantonese and overseas Chinese communities which was originated by Teochew people. As the name suggests, the ball is made of beef that has been finely pulverized, other ground meat such as pork may be the ingredients of the beef balls. They are easily distinguishable from fish balls due to their darker color.  Another characteristic is the tiny pieces of tendon in each ball will dissolve with prolonged cooking.

Production
Nearly all meatballs (made from pork, beef, fish, or other animal flesh) made in Asia differ significantly in texture to their counterparts with European origins. Instead of mincing and forming meats, meat used for making meatballs is pounded until the meat is more or less pulverized. This is also often the case for fillings in steamed dishes. This process is what lends a smooth texture to the meatballs. Pounding, unlike mincing, uncoils and stretches previously wound and tangled protein strands in meat and allows them to cure to a gel with heat in a similar manner as surimi.

Hong Kong

Beef balls are commonly mixed in with wonton noodles and other fish ball noodles. It is available in traditional markets and supermarkets. Beef balls are also a popular ingredient for hot pot dishes. It has a variety of uses within Chinese cuisine.

See also
Bakso
Fish ball
 List of meatball dishes
Meatball
Pork ball
Steamed meatball

References 

Teochew cuisine
Hong Kong cuisine
Beef dishes
Meatballs